Prince Roman Fedorovich Sanguszko (c. 1537 – 12 May 1571) was a soldier and statesman of the Grand Duchy of Lithuania. He served as governor (voivode) of Bracław and was hetman of Lithuania from 1567 until his death. He fought at the Battle of Ula in 1564 and belonged to the nesuhoizhskoy branch of the House of Sanguszko.

Sources
 https://ru.wikisource.org/wiki/%D0%A0%D0%91%D0%A1/%D0%92%D0%A2/%D0%A1%D0%B0%D0%BD%D0%B3%D1%83%D1%88%D0%BA%D0%B8
 Marcin Spórna. Słownik najsłynniejszych wodzów i dowódców polskich. Kraków 2006. 
 Mariusz Machynia. Sanguszko (Sanguszkowicz) Roman, kniaź z linii niesuchojesko-łokackiej (ok. 1537–1571) / Polski Słownik Biograficzny. — Wrocław — Warszawa — Kraków: Zakład Narodowy Imienia Ossolińskich Wydawnictwo Polskiej Akademii Nauk, 1993.— Tom XXXIV/4. — Zeszyt 143.— S. 500–505 (пол.).

16th-century births
1571 deaths
Roman
Field Hetmans of the Grand Duchy of Lithuania
Secular senators of the Polish–Lithuanian Commonwealth
People of the Livonian War